The Izh 2125 "Kombi" (Russian: ИЖ-2125 Комби, short for "combination") is a supermini car produced by the Soviet/Russian car manufacturer IZh from 1973 to 1997. It was based on an Izhevsk-modified Moskvitch 412, with the first prototype released in 1966 as a small family car. It was considered to be the first Soviet hatchback (released about a decade before the well-known Lada Samara), though the car actually possesses a station wagon body wherein the "D" pillar has its own support and does not gain from weight reduction (which would position the model more in the liftback family). In Russian literature the car is referred to as a liftback. For the same reason, the car was given the "Kombi" nickname, which in a way alludes to the Combi coupé (the word kombi itself meaning "station wagon" in German and Polish, while in Russian a station wagon is usually called "универсал" (universal)).

The Kombi had a notable success in sales within the USSR between 1974 and 1980 due to its durability, off-road capability, and increased carrying capacity. It was the first Izh car sold for export. Its popularity was also helped by limited competition – station wagon variants of the Lada, Moscow-built Moskvitch, and Volga were in short supply and not as easy to buy as the Kombi. In 1982, the Kombi received a facelift, along with the IZh-produced Moskvitch-412 and Izh 2715 panel van and was then rebranded as the 21251. Among notable features improved seats and headrests.

The modernised Izh 2125 sold into the 1990s. As the Soviet Union collapsed, IZh was first privatized as the open joint stock company "Izhevsk" and slowly started converting their automotive production lines to other kinds of manufacture, such as firearms. In 1995—96, when AZLK's revenue decreased drastically, the company was partially reacquired by AutoVAZ and renamed "IZhAuto". AvtoVAZ managers then discontinued all of Izh's previous models and ran their own ones into production. An all-new hatchback was introduced, called the Izh 2126 "Oda," and it ultimately replaced the Kombi.

Kalashnikov CV-1
On August 23, 2018 the arms manufacturer Kalashnikov presented an electric car with exterior design closely based on that of the Izh 2125. The range on one charge was claimed to be 350 km, but nothing else was ever heard of this.

Gallery

References

 IZh-2125, "Avtolegendy SSSR" Nr.54, DeAgostini 2011, ISSN 2071-095X 

Cars introduced in 1973
Soviet automobiles
Cars of Russia
1970s cars
1980s cars
1990s cars
Hatchbacks
Subcompact cars